is a train simulator. It is part of the Densha de Go! series. It was released in the arcades in Japan in 1998. It was ported to PlayStation, Nintendo 64, WonderSwan, Neo Geo Pocket Color, Windows, Dreamcast, and Game Boy Color. The Nintendo 64 version is titled Densha de Go! 64.

Gameplay
With 13 vehicles, on 16 missions, there are 7 main lines: Hokuhoku Line, Akita Shinkansen Line, Ōu Main Line, Tazawako Line, Keihin-Tōhoku Line, Yamanote Line, and the Tōkaidō Main Line.

Unique to the Nintendo 64 version is a Beginner Mode, which allows 999 seconds for the player to complete either the Training Course or Practice Course. The player is given an allotted amount of time to bring their train into the next station as well as a fixed time that the train was expected to arrive. If the player goes around curves too fast, stops suddenly or incurs other such dangers of train operation a few seconds are taken way from the remaining time they have to complete their task.

As with most Densha de Go! games, the Nintendo 64 version has a special controller which is plugged into controller outlet 3, while the voice mic is inserted into controller outlet 4, and a standard controller in outlet 1. It consists of a switch on the left that goes up and down, and it controls the train's speed, all five of its drive speeds, and Neutral. The handle on the right controls the breaking speeds 1–8, Emergency brake, and doors opening. Between these two levers is a slot in which that the player can place a pocket watch or stop watch (not included but designed to look more realistic) to keep the time as they drive. There are five buttons, A, B, C, Start, and Select. The select button acts as the Z button to show distance to the next stop, in some game variations.

Release
The game was ported to Nintendo 64 as Densha de Go! 64 in Japan in 1999. Densha de Go! 64 supports its uniquely bundled train-driving controller for Nintendo 64, which simulates actual train controls. It is one of two games that utilize Nintendo 64's Voice Recognition Unit (VRS). Like Hey You, Pikachu!, it is packaged with or without a microphone (called the Engineer's Pak), which is used to announce train stations to passengers.

In order to celebrate 3000 active Densha de Go! 2 arcade units, Taito released a new version of the game titled Densha de Go! 2 Kōsoku-hen 3000-bandai to the arcades. This version was ported to Dreamcast in 2000.

Fan translation
On April 1, 2017, an English fan translation patch was released for download which could be used with an emulator or flash cartridge. Developed by Nintendo 64 ROM hacker "zoinkity" and translator "mikeryan", the patch translates to English all HUD and menu elements as well as English-language support for the North American version of the Voice Recognition Unit peripheral.

Reception
In Japan, Game Machine listed Densha de Go! 2 Kōsoku-hen on their April 15, 1998 issue as being the third most-successful dedicated arcade game of the year. On release, Famitsu magazine scored the Densha de Go! 64 at 32 out of 40.

See also
 List of Taito games
 Shinkansen
 Train Simulator

References

External links
 Densha De Go! 2 at the Killer List of Videogames
 Densha De Go! 2 at Gaming-History
 Densha De Go! 2 3000-bandai at Gaming-History

1998 video games
Arcade video games
Dreamcast games
Game Boy Color games
Japan-exclusive video games
Microphone-controlled computer games
Neo Geo Pocket Color games
Nintendo 64 games
PlayStation (console) games
Taito games
Train simulation video games
Windows games
WonderSwan games
Video games developed in Japan